Urs Imboden (born January 7, 1975 in Santa Maria Val Müstair, Switzerland) is an alpine skier who has represented both Switzerland and Moldova.

He competed for Switzerland at the 2002 Winter Olympics, where he achieved his career best result; a fifth-place finish in the slalom.

In 2006, after a series of declining results he was kicked off the Swiss team, and he became a Moldovan citizen.

He then competed for Moldova at the 2010 Winter Olympics, failing to finish the first run of the slalom.

References

External links
 

1975 births
Living people
Swiss male alpine skiers
Moldovan male alpine skiers
Olympic alpine skiers of Switzerland
Olympic alpine skiers of Moldova
Alpine skiers at the 2002 Winter Olympics
Alpine skiers at the 2010 Winter Olympics
Naturalised citizens of Moldova